Kaloor Dennis is an Indian film scriptwriter and novelist in Malayalam movies. He started his career with Anubhavangale Nandi in 1979. He worked for more than 100 Malayalam movies with the areas of his contribution including script, story and dialogue. Popular movies scripted by him are Paithrikam, Oru Kudakkeezhil, New Year, Sandharbham and Paranju Theeratha Visheshangal, January Oru Ormma, Thooval Sparsham vendar Daniel state licency, Kalyanji Anandji, Kalamasseriyil Kalyanayogam, and Gajakesariyogam. His son Dinu Dennis has acted in the films Ottananayam (2005) and Ennitum (2006).

Career 
It was the script that he penned for Joshiy's movie 'Raktham' that made him popular as a writer. Dennis' association with the Malayalam film industry started in the mid 1970s when he and designer Kitho started a cinema magazine, Chitrapournami. This gave them the opportunity to interact with several top-line actors and directors. Dennis' first script was for the move 'Vayal' directed by Antony Eastman. Soman and Shubha played the lead roles. At that time Jagan Pictures Appachan was planning for a new movie after 'Chamaram'. Appachan read Dennis' novel 'Aakashathinu Keezhe' published in Chitrakaumudi weekly and expressed his interest to make a movie based on that novel.

Accordingly, Dennis completed the script. They had not finalised the actor and that Friday a new film- 'Moorkhan', was released at Ernakulam Padma. Appachan and Dennis went for the movie. The movie was racy and thrilling and during the interval, Appachan asked Dennis. "Why cant we approach this young man Varkkala Joshiy to direct 'Aakashathinu Keezhe'?" Joshiy was finalised. They hired two of the lead actors Prem Nazir and Madhu for the movie.

However, at the last minute, some problems arose regarding the location, and Appachan asked Dennis to find another story. But Dennis came up with a new subject the very next day. After penning the script, the movie was titled 'Raktham'.

"Raktham was the inaugural movie of Mymoon theatre. It had a successful hundred plus days run," remembers Dennis.

Kaloor Dennis is known as a scriptwriter standing along with the producer. As a result of this, Dennis often had a clash with the superstars. Mammootty, who acted as a hero in 24 of his films, had not been on speaking terms with Dennis for over 12 years. There were differences of opinion with Suresh Gopi also. The beginning of MACTA – Malayalam Cine Technicians Association was in fact formed as a backdrop of this rift with Suresh Gopi.

He is always of the opinion that producers should be respected and loved then and now. The intervention of actors cannot be accepted. The issue with Suresh Gopi which eventually led to the formation of MACTA started on the location of a movie named City Police scripted by him. The shooting of the film went on smoothly. Suresh Gopi was the hero of his next film Karpuradeepam also. There were differences of opinion on the location. Shooting was disrupted and the producer was in a crisis. He soon called Joshiy (director) and thought of forming an organisation for scriptwriters. Joshiy directed to include directors also. The first executive meet of MACTA was held at Bharat Tourist Home. It grew into a big cultural organization. MACTA was formed against Suresh Gopi. But Suresh Gopi started giving donation for it from the day it was formed. Their conflict lasted only for six months. Along with John Paul, Dennis went to the shooting location of Joshiy's film Bhupathi. Suresh Gopi was the hero of the film. When Suresh Gopi heard Dennis talking to Joshiy about convening MACTA's committee, he insisted that the committee of MACTA be convened in his house ! He also served a sumptuous sadya for everyone. After that, Suresh Gopi had acted in four to five films of Kaloor Dennis including Marc Antony and Paranju Theeratha Visheshangal

Awards
 1992 Kerala State Film Award for Best Screenplay for Kudumbasammedam

Partial filmography

Production
 Unnikrishnante Aadyathe Christmas (1988)

References

External links

Kaloor Dennis at MSI

Malayalam screenwriters
Malayalam-language lyricists
Living people
Year of birth missing (living people)
Place of birth missing (living people)